Edward Embarger was a U.S. soccer player who spent at least four seasons in the American Soccer League and earned two caps with the U.S. national team in 1954.

Professional career
Embarger played with the Philadelphia Americans of the American Soccer League from at least 1952.  The team was purchased by Uhrik Trucking Company during the 1953-1954 season and renamed Uhrik Truckers.  In 1955, Embarger moved to the New York Americans.

National team
Embarger earned two caps with the U.S. national team in January 1954.  The first was a 4-0 loss to Mexico on January 10.  The second was a 3-1 loss to Mexico four days later.

References

External links
 
 

American soccer players
United States men's international soccer players
American Soccer League (1933–1983) players
Uhrik Truckers players
New York Americans (soccer) (1933–1956) players
Living people
Association football defenders
Year of birth missing (living people)